Dana Chmelařová (born 25 August 1960) is a Czech diver. She competed in the women's 10 metre platform event at the 1980 Summer Olympics.

References

1960 births
Living people
Czech female divers
Olympic divers of Czechoslovakia
Divers at the 1980 Summer Olympics
Place of birth missing (living people)